Games played (most often abbreviated as G or GP) is a statistic used in team sports to indicate the total number of games in which a player has participated (in any capacity); the statistic is generally applied irrespective of whatever portion of the game is contested. In baseball, the statistic applies also to players who, prior to a game, are included on a starting lineup card or are announced as ex ante substitutes, whether or not they play; however, in Major League Baseball, the application of this statistic does not extend to consecutive games played streaks. A starting pitcher, then, may be credited with a game played even if he is not credited with a game started or an inning pitched. The catcher is a position for a baseball or softball player. When a batter takes his/her turn to hit, the catcher crouches behind home plate, in front of the (home) umpire, and receives the ball from the pitcher. In addition to these primary duties, the catcher is also called upon to master many other skills in order to field the position well. The role of the catcher is similar to that of the wicket-keeper in cricket. In the numbering system used to record defensive plays, the catcher is assigned the number 2.

Because catching is generally regarded as the most grueling position in baseball, catchers have historically played fewer games than any other non-pitching position; it is still unusual for a player to catch all of their team's games for even a month. Only eight players in history have caught in all of their team's games over the course of a season; five of those achieved the feat in the 19th century, when the seasons were generally much shorter, and the other three did so during World War II, when player availability was sharply limited. Prior to 1944, only seven players caught 145 games in a season, none more than once. When Bob Boone became the first player to catch 2,000 major league games in 1988, it was over a quarter century after every other non-pitching position had seen a player reach that milestone. But in recent decades, the workload of top major league catchers has gradually increased, and the top ten career leaders all made their major league debuts after 1968.

Iván Rodríguez is the all-time leader in games played as a catcher, playing 2,427 games at the position. Carlton Fisk (2,226), Bob Boone (2,225), Yadier Molina (2,184), Gary Carter (2,056) and Jason Kendall (2,025) are the only other players to play 2,000 or more games as a catcher. Molina, of the St. Louis Cardinals, is the only player to catch 2,000 games with one team.

Key

List

Stats updated as of the end of the 2022 season.

Other Hall of Famers

Notes

References

External links

Major League Baseball statistics
Games played as a catcher